Dongguan Mosque is a mosque in Xining, Qinghai Province, China. It is the largest mosque in Qinghai.

History
Restored recently, it was originally built in 1380 and has colorful white arches along the outside of the wide building. It has a green and white dome and two tall minarets. The mosque saw renovations in the late 19th to early 20th century. Shortly after, the mosque suffered heavy damages caused by political conflict. However, it continued to undergo restorations throughout the rest of the 20th century.

Generals Ma Qi and Ma Bufang controlled the Great Dongguan Mosque when they were military governors of Qinghai.

In 1989, tens of thousands of Muslims gathered around the mosque to protest against a book that demeaned Islam & Chinese Muslims. In October 1993, Muslims in the mosque protested against another book; the Chinese army then stormed the mosque and evicted the protestors.

In 2021, it was reported that the green dome and minarets of the mosque, which are builded in 2000, are were removed in a remodel, some reports said it make the structure look more "Chinese" in an attempt by the CCP at sinicization, and the others said that it was restored to its original Chinese localization style. The management committee of the mosque said that the removed part was not part of the original structure as a cultural relic, and they remind not to create or spread rumors, and be misled by malicious people.

Architecture 
The mosque covers an area of 11,940 square metres. In the Ming period, the mosque consisted of a single courtyard with a worship hall and two multi-storey minarets. The modern mosque is built in Chinese Islamic architectural style and contains elements of western architecture.

Pictures

See also 
 Islam in China
 List of mosques in China

References

External links 
 

Mosques in China
Buildings and structures in Xining
1380 establishments in Asia
14th-century establishments in China